Route 102 is a  north–south highway along the northwestern corner of the Avalon Peninsula on the island of Newfoundland. It connects the communities of Fox Harbour and Ship Harbour with the town of Dunville and Route 100 (Cape Shore Highway). Between Dunville and Fox Harbour, the road is known as Fox Harbour Road, and between Fox Harbour and Ship Harbour, it is known as Ship Harbour Road.

Route description

Route 102 begins at an intersection with Route 100 in downtown Dunville and heads north through neighbourhoods before leaving town and winding its through wooded areas, where it passes by the site of Villa Marie. The highway now passes through Fox Harbour before coming closer to the coastline and winding its through hilly terrain. Route 102 now passes along the water's edge as it passes through Ship Harbour, where the road dead ends in a neighbourhood.

Major intersections

References

102